Aniq Bajra  is a Syrian village located in Al-Saan Subdistrict in Salamiyah District, Hama.  According to the Syria Central Bureau of Statistics (CBS), Aniq Bajra had a population of 313 in the 2004 census. Aniq Bajra was captured by SAA on 21 January 2018 from ISIS.

References 

Populated places in Salamiyah District